Arne Joachim Bendiksen (19 October 1926 – 26 March 2009) was a Norwegian singer, composer and producer, described as "the father of pop music" in Norway.

Career
Bendiksen was born in Bergen, Norway.  In the 1950s, 1960s and 1970s, he was a major figure in Norwegian popular music. First, as a member of the group The Monn Keys, later as soloist and composer for other artists. Besides writing his own songs, he also translated many foreign hits into Norwegian, making them Norwegian hits. Arne Bendiksen took part in the Norwegian Eurovision Song Contest selections several times, both as an artist and as a songwriter. Three times he represented Norway in Eurovision as singer; in 1964 (Eurovision Song Contest 1964) with Spiral as soloist, in 1973 (Eurovision Song Contest 1973) with Å, for et spill and in 1974 (Eurovision Song Contest 1974) with Hvor er du?. Four times he took part as composer, most memorable as songwriter for Åse Kleveland's Intet er nytt under solen in 1966 (Eurovision Song Contest), finishing a strong third.

Beginning in 1964 he was the boss of his own record company. Thanks to him, popular artists like Wenche Myhre and Kirsti Sparboe reached fame. However, in the Eurovision Song Contest finals of 1969, Norway received a mere 1 point for the song Oj, oj, oj, så glad jeg skal bli, which was composed by Arne Bendiksen and performed by Kirsti Sparboe.

Arne did not let this crush his spirits though, and he continued his dedicated work as a singer/songwriter throughout the 1970s. In the 1980s, he gave a shot at the popular children's cassette industry and released his major children's work Barnefest i Andeby – Children's party in Duckburg – a cassette filled with catchy songs about the various Disney characters inhabiting the fictional city of Duckburg. This popular cassette got a sequel, released especially for the Christmas season, called Jul i Andeby – Christmas in Duckburg''.

In June 2006, his all-new self-composed children's musical stage debuted in the small elementary school Fjellstrand Skole in Nesodden, Akershus.

Arne Bendiksen died on 26 March 2009, after having been sick for a short period of time. The cause of death was heart failure.

Famous songs

 "Jeg vil ha en blå ballong"
 "Intet er nytt under solen"
 "Oj, oj, oj, så glad jeg skal bli"
 "Lykken er..."
 "Og han kvakk-, kvakk-, kvakk-, kvakk-, kvakker når han ser, pengene blir fler' og fler'!"
 "Knekke egg"
 "Det blir ikke regn i dag"

References

1926 births
2009 deaths
Musicians from Bergen
Melodi Grand Prix contestants
Norwegian male composers
Eurovision Song Contest entrants for Norway
Eurovision Song Contest entrants of 1964
Eurovision Song Contest conductors
Norwegian pop singers
Norwegian singer-songwriters
Melodi Grand Prix winners
Spellemannprisen winners
20th-century Norwegian male singers
20th-century Norwegian singers
20th-century conductors (music)